Peter Bertheau is a Swedish bridge player.

Bridge accomplishments

Wins

 World Olympiad Teams Championship (1) 2012
 North American Bridge Championships (4)
 Jacoby Open Swiss Teams (1) 2003 
 Mitchell Board-a-Match Teams (1) 2004 
 Roth Open Swiss Teams (1) 2005 
 von Zedtwitz Life Master Pairs (1) 2011

Runners-up

 Rosenblum Cup (1) 2006 
 North American Bridge Championships (2)
 Jacoby Open Swiss Teams (1) 2004 
 Spingold (1) 2013

References

External links
 
 

Swedish contract bridge players
Living people
Year of birth missing (living people)